The  Murugappa family is an Indian Nagarathar (Nattukottai Chettiar) family that owns and manages the Murugappa Group, a conglomerate with interests in bicycles, sugar, abrasives, fertilizers, financial services, and manufacturing. In 2021, their net worth was estimated at INR 417 billion.

Members include Murugappa Group former chairmen, M.M Murugappan, M.V. Subbiah and A Vellayan

The Group & family

Murugappa Chettiar Family

 Murugappa family
 Founder: 
 Dewan Bahadur A. M. Murugappa Chettiar

 Second Generation: 
A. M. M. Murugappa Chettiar
A. M. M. Vellayan Chettiar
A. M. M. Arunachalam

Murugappa Group

Corporate
 Holding Company  
 Ambadi Investments Limited

 Corporate Body  
 Murugappa Corporate Advisory Board

Group - Chairman(Murugappa Family) 

 Murugappa family
 Founder: 
 Dewan Bahadur A. M. Murugappa Chettiar

 Past Chairman: 
A. M. M. Murugappa Chettiar
A. M. M. Arunachalam
M. M. Muthaiah
M. V. Arunachalam
M. V. Murugappan
M. V. Subbiah
M. A. Alagappan
A. Vellayan
M. M. Murugappan

References

Business families of India
Hindu families
Indian billionaires
Murugappa Group